Wenecja  (Polish for Venice) is a village in the administrative district of Gmina Żnin, within Żnin County, Kuyavian-Pomeranian Voivodeship, in north-central Poland.
The village has a population of 300.

Its picturesque location among three lakes (Biskupinskie, Weneckie, Skrzynka) resulted in its name alluding to the location of Italian Venice. The village, called "the pearl of Pałuki", is one of the greatest tourist attractions in the Pałuki region. Wenecja is located on the line of the narrow gauge railway running from the town of Żnin to famous Biskupin and further on to Gąsawa. The Narrow Gauge Railway Museum and the ruins of the 14th century castle attract thousands of tourists to this beautiful Pałuki village.

See also 
 Biskupin
 Heritage railways
 Kuyavian-Pomeranian Voivodship
 narrow gauge railway
 Narrow Gauge Railway Museum in Wenecja
 Pałuki
 Żnin

External links 

 Urząd Miejski - Żnin Town Hall
 Starostwo Powiatowe - Żnin County Office
 The Archaeological Museum in Biskupin
 The Narrow Gauge Railway Company in Żnin
 Muzeum Ziemi Pałuckiej - The Museum of the Pałuki Land in Żnin

Wenecja